The Silver City Comet was a train service that operated from September 1937 until November 1989 between Parkes and Broken Hill in western New South Wales. It was the first air-conditioned train in Australia.

Design
The original engines were built in Belfast by Harland & Wolff under licence from Burmeister & Wain known as the "Harlandic" type. An eight cylinder in line uniflow two-stroke engines with blower scavenging which developed  at 1200 rpm. Two "National"  diesel generator sets producing DC power for train lighting and air conditioning.

These are coupled in pairs through a GM Model TCLA 965 torque converter to gear boxes connected to each of the bogies. A Standard Waygood GM 120 volt, generator set for power requirements including train lighting, cooking and air conditioning.

Service
Broken Hill had two tramways which were established by the early 1900s. One was closed in 1926 due to being unprofitable while the other was converted to standard gauge rail in 1919 and eventually connected to Sydney via the Broken Hill line in 1927.

When the rolling stock was ordered, it was planned that they would be utilised on both the Parkes to Broken Hill and Dubbo to Bourke services. In September 1937, the Silver City Comet commenced operating three times a week between Parkes and Broken Hill connecting with the Western Mail from Sydney. This was increased to daily from May 1938 before reverting to thrice weekly in October 1939. This released some stock for transfer to Sydney to operate Federal City Express services to Canberra from October 1939 until November 1945. In April 1940, the remaining stock was also transferred to Sydney to operate Newcastle Flyer services for a few months.

From January 1957, Silver City Comet stock operated a three times per week service from Parkes to Orange and Dubbo. Following the introduction of the Central West XPT service to Dubbo, in April 1982 this was cut back to Orange, but was extended to start at Forbes.  By 1983, the Parkes - Forbes section was by bus.  By 1986, the mail was withdrawn.  Silver City Comet was retimed to connect with Central West XPT, three days per week each way.  The Orange - Forbes connection on the other four days was now by airconditioned bus.

Rolling stock

The New South Wales Government Railways placed orders for five diesel power vans with Eveleigh Carriage Workshops and 12 trailer cars with Ritchie Brothers, Auburn in the mid-1930s. The double ended power cars were each fitted with two Harland & Wolff Hardlandic diesel engines. PH 105 was destroyed by fire at Ivanhoe in January 1950 with the remaining four repowered with General Motors 6–110 engines between 1952 and 1957. DP 102 was withdrawn after being struck at a level crossing at Forbes in August 1982. The carriages were the first in Australia to feature air-conditioning.

Originally painted silver with blue lining, in the 1950s they were repainted in the standard tuscan and russet livery. By the 1970s they had returned to their original livery. In the 1980s they were repainted into the State Rail Authority's candy colours before once again being returned to their original livery in time for their 50th anniversary in 1987.

In its twilight years, the Silver City Comet became a popular train for enthusiast tours including operating to Melbourne (Vic.) in February 1983, up the North Coast line to Brisbane in April 1986 and the Main Northern line to Tenterfield in October 1989.

In September 1987, to celebrate the 50th anniversary of their entry into service, a set operated tours from Sydney to Canberra and Kiama.

Trailer Cars
Along with the power cars, 12 air-conditioned passenger trailers were ordered from Ritchie Brothers of Auburn NSW. The trailers were built in three configurations – four First Class sitting cars (coded BT 201–204), four Second Class sitting cars with buffet (coded RFT 205–208) and four Second Class sitting cars (coded FT 209–212). Two additional parcel trailers (coded HT 301–302) were also constructed by NSWGR Carriage Works at Eveleigh, NSW.

The passenger trailers were each 55 feet long while the parcel trailers were 42 feet long. All cars featured a full-length side skirt below the floor level, partially covering the bogies and underfloor equipment. They were all painted in the same silver and blue livery as the power cars.

The trailers were constructed principally of aluminium alloy on a steel underframe. The cars were arranged internally with two saloons separated by male and female toilets. Entrance doors and vestibules were provided at each end.

The trailers were refurbished in the early 1950s to bring them up to the same standard as the new air-conditioned HUB and RUB daylight express carriages. The original First Class seating was retained and reclassified as Second Class, while new First Class seating was installed. Two buffet cars (DR 205 and 207) were also converted into full dining cars.

FT 212 was converted to a relief parcel trailer in 1953 and was condemned following a shunting accident in 1968. Following the demise of DEH 212 an Emergency Parcel Trailer (ETP 1475) was converted to operate with the Comet and renumbered EDH 320. This vehicle was condemned in 1981. To fulfil the luggage and parcel loading requirements on Comet services following the withdrawal of DH 301 and 302 and EDH 320, two surplus 500 Class trailer cars (HCT 504 and 508) were converted into Comet parcels trailers in 1985.

Demise and Preservation
On 3 November 1989, the final Silver City Comet ran with road transport taking over the service.

Following their withdrawal in November 1989, the rolling stock was disposed of by auction at Parkes on 22 December 1989. The State Rail Authority donated a power van and four carriages to the City of Broken Hill that was placed on display at the Sulphide Street Railway Museum, and a carriage to the City of Parkes. The Dorrigo Steam Railway & Museum and New South Wales Rail Transport Museum (now the NSW Rail Museum) each purchased a power van and four carriages respectively. These latter two sets both moved to the Rail Motor Society, Paterson in April 1990. Dorrigo's stock was moved to Kooragang Island in May 1994 and subsequently to Dorrigo, while the Rail Transport Museum's stock moved to Thirlmere in April 1999.

Power Car Roster

Trailer Car Roster

Gallery

References

Further reading

http://www.railmotorsociety.org.au/rm_home_master_frame.htm, then via the index to the two Silver City Comet sets.
Railmotor Society's webpage, with a comprehensive history of construction, layouts and changes through the years.

Broken Hill, New South Wales
Named passenger trains of New South Wales
Passenger rail transport in New South Wales
Railway services introduced in 1937
Railway services discontinued in 1989
1937 establishments in Australia
1989 disestablishments in Australia
Discontinued railway services in Australia